Yu-kai Chou (Chinese: 周郁凱; born May 9, 1986) is a Taiwanese-American entrepreneur, author, speaker, business consultant, and experience designer. He is one of the earliest pioneers in the industry of gamification. He has been a regular keynote speaker lecturer on Gamification at organizations like TEDx Lausanne, Stanford University, Google, Tesla, Lego, Huawei, Uber, Boston Consulting Group, among others. Chou is the creator of the Octalysis Framework and the Founder/CEO of the consultancy The Octalysis Group and the mentorship education platform Octalysis Prime.

Early life and education
Chou was born in Taipei, Taiwan. Because of his father's work as a diplomat for the Taiwanese government, he grew up in Taiwan, South Africa, and the United States. He received his undergraduate degree in Bachelors of Arts in Economics/International Area Studies from the University of California, Los Angeles (commonly known as UCLA) in 2007.

Career
In 2003, Chou started his research on gamification and helped pioneer the gamification industry.

In 2004, Chou started his first company, The FD Network, which connected professionals of various industries together to help each other through a gamified system.

In 2007, Chou co-founded Future Delivery, LLC., a company that focuses on gamified productivity and professional development. Its flagship project FDCareer, was rated on Mashable as one of the “Top 10 Social Networks for Generation-Y” in 2009.

In 2009, Chou co-founded Viralogy, Inc., a gamified social media rank aiming to become a leaderboard of the top online influencers. It later launched the gamified restaurant and retail loyalty program RewardMe.

In 2012, Chou stepped down as CEO of Viralogy, Inc., and published his Octalysis gamification framework on his blog to analyze and build strategies around the various systems to increase motivation and engagement. It was widely received, and his work was organically translated into over 16 languages within a year. Chou then started to speak across the globe and teach his Octalysis Framework.

In 2015, The Octalysis Framework was published into a book called Actionable Gamification: Beyond Points, Badges, and Leaderboard. The book has also been published in Taiwan, South Korea, China.

In 2016, Chou co-founded The Octalysis Group. The Octalysis Group is a premium design and consulting firm specializing in gamification and behavioral design using the Octalysis Framework. The firm served globally recognized companies like Porsche, Uber, Volkswagen, Microsoft, AIG Japan, Lego, Huawei, eBay, CapitalOne, Avon, Fidelity Investments, among others

In 2018, Yu-kai Chou was appointed Chief Experience Officer for Toronto-based Decentral, helping Ethereum Cofounder Anthony Di Iorio improve experiences for the cryptocurrency wallet Jaxx Liberty.

Chou also launched Octalysis Prime, a gamified education and mentorship platform to pass on his knowledge in gamification, entrepreneurship, productivity and behavioral science to subscribed members.

In 2021,  Yu-kai Chou was appointed Head of Digital Commerce and Head of Creative Labs for HTC in Taiwan. He helped improve HTC's digital presence and the launching of VR Headsets such as the VIVE Focus 3 and the VIVE Flow.

Global Influence
It was calculated from all of Chou's work on gamification, his design work improved over 1 billion user experiences worldwide through his clients at Microsoft, Lego, eBay, HTC, Volkswagen, and more. Chou also advised many governments including Singapore, UK, South Korea, and the Kingdom of Bahrain..

Chou is honored with the title of a Knight by His Imperial Highness King Yi Seok, the only remaining heir living in Korea to the Joseon dynasty throne which ruled over the country for five centuries. The Imperial Family of Korea is the ruling family of the Joseon and Korean Empire that was founded by King Seong-gye Lee in July 1392.

Awards

Rated #1 among the “Gamification Gurus Power 100” by RISE in 2015

“Gamification Guru of the Year” Award in 2014, 2015 and 2017 by the World Gamification Congress

Rated “#1 Industry Project in Gamification” in 2017 by the Gamification Europe Conference

“Gamification Guru of the Year” in 2017 by the Gamification Europe Conference.

Personal life
Chou is an avid fan of video games since his childhood in South Africa. He also coached chess for K-12 students.  Yu-kai converted to Christianity from Atheism in 2002 and has publicly declared his faith through his work. In 2012, Chou married his wife Angel Cheng at Forerunner Christian Church. In December 2017, they gave birth to fraternal twin daughters named Symphony Chou and Harmony Chou.

See also
Octalysis
Gamification
List of Taiwanese Americans

References

1986 births
Living people
Gamification